Suk is a both a given name and a surname. Notable people with the name include:

Surname
Suk (Korean name), uncommon Korean surname
Cyril Suk (born 1967), Czech tennis player
Feliks Suk (1845–1915), Croatian university professor and rector of the University of Zagreb
Grigoriy Suk (1896–1917), flying ace during World War I
Jeannie Suk (born 1973), law professor at Harvard Law School
Joey Suk (born 1989), Dutch-Indonesian footballer, currently with the Dutch club Go Ahead Eagles
Josef Suk (composer) (1874–1935), Czech composer of classical music
Josef Suk (violinist) (1929–2011), grandson of Josef Suk, the composer
Julie Suk (born 1924), American poet from Charlotte, North Carolina
Mykola Suk (born 1945), Ukrainian pianist
Oleh Suk (born 1965), Ukrainian rock musician, primarily bass guitar
Sao Seng Suk (1935–2007), Prominent Shan leader in Burma, also known as Khun Kyar Nu
Václav Suk (1861–1933), also Vyacheslav Ivanovich Suk, violinist and composer

Given name
Suk Bahadur, a Burmese footballer who served as the captain of Myanmar national football team (1952-1970)
Suk Bahadur Rai, only Gurkha to have received the Aung San Thuriya medal
Suk Sam Eng, Cambodian politician